The FINA World Open Water Swimming Championships, or more commonly "Open Water Worlds", was a bi-annual FINA championship for open water swimming held in even years from 2000 to 2010, inclusive. Race distances were 5, 10, and 25 kilometers (also known as 5K, 10K, and 25K).

The 10 km race at the 2008 edition served as the main qualifying event for the 2008 Olympics 10 km event.

Editions
Twelve editions were part of the World Aquatics Championships, and six edition were stand alone editions. From 2011 the biannual event is included only into the World Aquatics Championships.

Stand alone editions
The Open Water Worlds were held in the years between the FINA's main World Championships, providing an annual championships for Open Water Swimming. At its January 2010 meeting, the FINA Bureau decided that to replace this event with a junior (18 and under) championships, making the 2010 Open Water Worlds the last edition of these championships, and 2012 seeing the first of a Junior Open Water Worlds.

All-time medal table

Multiple medalists 

The best swimmers:

Men

Women

See also
Open water swimming at the World Aquatics Championships
FINA Marathon Swim World Series
Open Water Swimmers of the Year

References

 
Recurring sporting events established in 2000
Recurring sporting events disestablished in 2011
FINA World Swimming Championships
Open water swimming competitions